Valter D. Longo (born October 9, 1967) is an Italian-American biogerontologist and cell biologist known for his studies on the role of fasting and nutrient response genes on cellular protection aging and diseases and for proposing that longevity is regulated by similar genes and mechanisms in many eukaryotes. He is currently a professor at the USC Davis School of Gerontology with a joint appointment in the department of Biological Sciences as well as serving as the director of the USC Longevity Institute.

Early life and education 
Longo was born in Genoa, Italy to Calabrian parents. He moved to Chicago in the United States as a teenager in order to become a professional rock guitarist, and lived with extended relatives. While there, he observed that his relatives in the United States, who were eating diets rich in fat, meat and sugar, were suffering from cardiovascular disease, which was rare among his family living in Italy. He joined the United States Army Reserve as a way to pay for college, attending recruit training in Fort Knox. He then attended the University of North Texas College of Music due to its renown as a jazz school, studying under Dan Haerle and Jack Petersen, among others. While in college, Longo decided to change focus and study nutrition and longevity instead, inspired in part by his observations about his relatives, as well as his experience in military training. He graduated from the University of North Texas in 1992 with a degree in biochemistry.

In 1992 he joined the laboratory of "calorie restriction" pioneer Roy Walford at UCLA where he studied calorie restriction and aging of the immune system. He completed his PhD work in Biochemistry studying antioxidant enzymes and anti-aging genes under Joan Valentine at UCLA in 1997 and his postdoctoral training in the neurobiology of Alzheimer's disease under Caleb Finch at the University of Southern California.

Career 
Since 1997, Longo has been a faculty member at the USC Davis School of Gerontology and Ethel Percy Andrus Gerontology Center. He is a member of the formation of USC's Biology of Aging program as well as the director of the USC Longevity Institute, also launched the USC Davis School of Gerontology's first study-abroad program, a summer class in the nutrition and genetics of aging in Italy.

In 2011, he was profiled on Through the Wormhole with Morgan Freeman for his longevity-related research.

Fasting mimicking diet 
Longo's fasting-mimicking diet (FMD) is a low-calorie, low-protein, moderate-carbohydrate, moderate-fat meal program that is claimed to mimic the effects of periodic fasting or water fasting over the course of five days, while still aiming to provide the body with nutrition. FMD is considered a periodic fast.

Longo developed the diet at the University of Southern California. He believes that it is possible to mimic the effects of fasting with a meal program that is designed to inhibit the same metabolic pathways fasting would, thereby providing the body with nutrients that do not trigger the body's growth responses.

Fasting mimicking diet is trademarked by L-Nutra, a company partially owned by Longo with financial interest by USC.

Honors 
Nathan Shock Lecture Award, National Institute on Aging, NIH, 2010

Works
 Valter Longo bibliography at National Library of Medicine

References

External links 
 

1967 births
Biogerontologists
Living people
Italian emigrants to the United States
Cell biologists
Fasting researchers
University of California, Los Angeles alumni
University of Southern California faculty
University of North Texas alumni
Scientists from Genoa
People of Calabrian descent